The Confessions of Felix Krull (German: Bekenntnisse des Hochstaplers Felix Krull) is a 1982  adventure television series based on the novel of the same title by Thomas Mann. It was shot as a co-production between Austria, France and West Germany.

The story had previously been adapted into a 1957 film Confessions of Felix Krull.

Main cast
 John Moulder-Brown as Felix Krull
  as Felix Krull (Young)
 Magali Noël as Mme Houpflé
 Fernando Rey as Professor Kuckuck
 Rita Tushingham as Mrs. Twentyman
 Joss Ackland as Mr. Twentyman
 Hans Heinz Moser as Herr Sturzil
 Pierre Doris as Detective
  as Monsieur Machatschek
 Klaus Schwarzkopf as Father Krull
  as Mother Krull
 Mareike Carrière as Olympia 
 Franziska Walser as Genoveva
 Rolf Zacher as Stanko 
 Vera Tschechowa as Maria Pia
 Georgia Slowe as Zouzou
 Kurt Raab as Sally Meerschaum
 Nikolaus Paryla as Schimmelpreester
  as Rosza
 James Cossins as Lord Kilmarnock
  as Zaza
 
 Ulrich Beiger
 Loriot as Thomas Mann (cameo)

References

Bibliography
 Bock, Hans-Michael & Bergfelder, Tim. The Concise CineGraph. Encyclopedia of German Cinema. Berghahn Books, 2009.

External links
 

1982 German television series debuts
1982 German television series endings
1982 French television series debuts
1982 French television series endings
English-language television shows
French-language television shows
German-language television shows
Films based on works by Thomas Mann
Television shows based on German novels
Television series set in the 1890s